Tariq Luqmaan Trotter (born October 3, 1973), better known as Black Thought, is an American rapper, singer, actor and the lead MC of the Philadelphia-based hip hop group the Roots, which he co-founded with drummer Questlove (Ahmir Thompson). Regarded as "one of the most skilled, incisive, and prolific rappers of his time", he is widely lauded for his live performance skills, continuous multisyllabic rhyme schemes, complex lyricism, double entendres, and politically aware lyrics. With the Roots, he is a singer and rapper on The Tonight Show Starring Jimmy Fallon, frequently playing games with Fallon and his guests.

Early life 
Black Thought was born Tarik Luqmaan Trotter, to Thomas and Cassandra Trotter, both members of the Nation of Islam. His father was murdered when Trotter was one year old, and his mother was murdered when he was in high school. He spent time tagging "DT" or "Double T" with graffiti around Philadelphia. He sold crack cocaine briefly, and was sent to live with family in Detroit for a few months in high school. Trotter attended the Philadelphia High School for Creative and Performing Arts and Millersville University, studying journalism. In 1987, he became friends with drummer Ahmir "Questlove" Thompson and formed a drummer/MC duo, performing on the streets of Philadelphia and at talent shows. Trotter subsequently spent some time as one of two MCs in the group the Square Roots; the other was Malik B., whom Tariq met in college. In high school, Black Thought became interested in the lessons of the Nation of Gods and Earths.

The Roots 
The Square Roots renamed themselves the Roots and released their debut album Organix in 1993. The Roots signed to DGC and followed up with Do You Want More?!!!??! in 1995. Recorded without any sampling, the album was more popular among alternative music fans than those of hip hop. Around the release of the album, the Roots performed at the Lollapalooza alternative music festival and Montreux Jazz Festival. Illadelph Halflife, the band's 1996 album, became its first to chart within the top 40 spots on the Billboard 200 because of the successful single "What They Do". Things Fall Apart followed in 1999, the year the band played at the Woodstock 99 concert.

In 2000, the Roots won the Grammy Award for Best Rap Performance by a Duo or Group for "You Got Me", with guest performances by Erykah Badu and Eve. Things Fall Apart was nominated for Best Rap Album. For Jay-Z's acoustic concert for the television program MTV Unplugged, the Roots provided instrumentals. Succeeding albums were Phrenology (2002), The Tipping Point (2004), Game Theory (2006), Rising Down (2008), How I Got Over (2010), Undun (2011), and …And Then You Shoot Your Cousin (2014).

Other work 
Black Thought starred in films such as Bamboozled (2000), and the 2001 films Perfume, Love Rome, and Brooklyn Babylon.

Black Thought's numerous musical guest performances include "Pimpas Paradise", by Damian "Jr. Gong" Marley; "Hard Hitters", by Dilated Peoples; "Stolen Moments Part 2", by Common; "X-Ecutioner Style", by Linkin Park; "My Favorite Mutiny", by the Coup; "Right Now", by Fort Minor; and "Rafiki", by Zap Mama.

Black Thought recorded a solo album, to be titled Masterpiece Theatre and released in 2001, but the project was scrapped after he learned that the album would not count toward the Roots' contractual commitments. Most of the songs from the project appeared on Phrenology.

In 2006, he began working on a collaborative project with producer Danger Mouse, titled Dangerous Thoughts. As of February 2021, the album had not been released. In May 2022, it was announced that the album would be called Cheat Codes and would be released on August 10.

In a June 2008 interview with Brian Kayser of the website HipHopGame, Black Thought spoke of another solo project that was scheduled for release on the Razor and Tie music corporation. He said that Questlove might work on production. As of September 2014, neither Black Thought nor the solo album are listed on the Razor & Tie website.

In February 2011, Black Thought, along with 10.Deep and the "Money Making Jam Boys" collective—the latter of which includes Dice Raw, S.T.S., Truck North and P.O.R.N.—released the mixtape The Prestige.

Together with U.K. artist Lotek, Black Thought appeared on the song "Living in Bunkers", by Australian hip hop group Hilltop Hoods, which was released on the Drinking From the Sun album in March 2012. Also in March 2012, Black Thought performed with Nneka and Clef nite at BET 106 and Park. They performed the song "God Knows Why", from the former's album Soul Is Heavy, which they collaborated on.

In early 2013, Black Thought confirmed his continuing work, with Jim James and Tunde Adebimpe, on a solo album entitled Talented Mr. Trotter. At this time, he began work on a memoir with journalist and music critic Jeff Chang and filmmaker Maori Karmael.

As of April 2015, Black Thought has yet to release a solo album, but when asked about the long-awaited project by a fan on Twitter, he said he's "working on it". He did not offer further details.

In February 2016, Black Thought joined forces with Fashawn, Murs, and Del the Funky Homosapien to record a new track called "Rise Up" for the video game Street Fighter V. A video for the song was released by Capcom, and includes appearances by Black Thought and his fellow collaborators.

In December 2017, Black Thought appeared on HOT 97 with Funkmaster Flex and performed a 10-minute freestyle over "The Learning (Burn)" instrumental by Mobb Deep. This freestyle went widely viral, trending on Twitter for the next days and hitting millions of views on YouTube. Streams of Thought, Vol. 1, a collaborative EP with producer 9th Wonder, was released on June 1, 2018. Streams of Thought, Vol. 2, a collaboration with producer Salaam Remi, was released on November 26, 2018. Black Thought also had a feature on the track Crowns for Kings in Benny the Butcher's 2019 EP The Plugs I Met.

On August 28, 2020, Black Thought released the single "Good Morning" featuring Pusha T, Swizz Beatz and Killer Mike. It was included on Streams of Thought, Vol. 3: Cane & Able, which includes 13 tracks and collaborations with Portugal. The Man, Schoolboy Q and the Last Artful, Dodgr. He also did a feature on Eminem's song "Yah Yah" from Music to Be Murdered By album earlier that year.

Black Thought made his theatrical debut in January 2022, playing Dr. Junius Crookman in Black No More, a musical for which he also wrote the lyrics and co-wrote the music.

In May 2022, musician and producer Danger Mouse and Black Thought announced their upcoming collaborative studio album called Cheat Codes, due to release on August 12, 2022. The same day, they released the album's first single called No Gold Teeth. The album's track list, posted on the duo's newly-created Instagram page, lists multiple featured guests, such as Raekwon, Kid Sister, Joey Badass, Russ, Dylan Cartlidge, late MF Doom (appearing posthumously), Michael Kiwanuka, ASAP Rocky, Run the Jewels, and Conway the Machine. Some of these artists have already worked with Danger Mouse and/or Black Thought in the past, most notably MF Doom, who teamed up with Danger Mouse to form Danger Doom in 2003. Danger Doom's 2006 EP 2006 was later reissued with a previously unreleased bonus track featuring by Black Thought.

Legacy 
Black Thought is "widely recognized as one of the most skilled, incisive, and prolific rappers of his time", according to AllMusic critic Andy Kellman. Henry Adaso of About.com praises him as "a surgeon of emceeing", and he is highly regarded for his multisyllabic rhymes, internal rhymes, flow, breath control, socially conscious lyrics, and live performances. Questlove stated that Black Thought's clarity and logic also distinguishes him from other emcees, and Stephen Kearse of Pitchfork notes that his "ability to use words as textures as much as tools has always been a hallmark of his style". In the book How to Rap, emcee Kool G Rap described seeing the Roots perform his song "Men at Work" at a show; "I never really liked to perform it that much—because your breath control gotta be crazy. But somebody sent me a clip of the Roots ... and [Black Thought] did all three fucking verses and I couldn't believe it—he killed that shit". Black Thought has influenced several hip hop artists, including Logic, Joey Badass, Rapsody, k-os, and Shad.

Personal life 
Black Thought and his wife Michelle were married in 2010. He has four sons and a daughter.

Discography 

Studio albums
 Streams of Thought, Vol. 3: Cane & Able (2020)
 Cheat Codes (with Danger Mouse) (2022)
 Glorious Game (with El Michels Affair) (2023)

EPs
 Streams of Thought, Vol. 1 (2018)
 Streams of Thought, Vol. 2 (2018)
African Dreams (with Seun Kuti) (2022)

With the Roots
 Organix (1993)
 Do You Want More?!!!??! (1995)
 Illadelph Halflife (1996)
 Things Fall Apart (1999)
 Phrenology (2002)
 The Tipping Point (2004)
 Game Theory (2006)
 Rising Down (2008)
 How I Got Over (2010)
 Undun (2011)
 ...And Then You Shoot Your Cousin (2014)

Guest appearances

Filmography 
 Bamboozled (2000)
 Brooklyn Babylon (2001)
 Perfume (2001)
 Brown Sugar (2002)
 Love Rome (2004)
 Explicit IIIs (2008)
 Night Catches Us (2010)
 On the Inside (2011)
 Yelling to the Sky (2011)
 Get On Up (2014)
 Stealing Cars (2015)
 The Deuce (2017)
 Unbreakable Kimmy Schmidt  (2018)
 Tick, Tick... Boom! (2021)

References

Further reading

External links 
 
 The Roots official site
 Black Thought discography

1973 births
Living people
The Tonight Show Band members
African-American male actors
African-American male rappers
Def Jam Recordings artists
Geffen Records artists
Millersville University of Pennsylvania alumni
Five percenters
The Roots members
Alternative hip hop musicians
East Coast hip hop musicians
Songwriters from Pennsylvania
21st-century American male actors
Rappers from Philadelphia
Male actors from Philadelphia
American male film actors
20th-century American male actors
Grammy Award winners
Former Nation of Islam members
21st-century American rappers
American people of Mandinka descent
American people of Mende descent
Philadelphia High School for the Creative and Performing Arts alumni
African-American songwriters
African-American film score composers